Southland Field  is a public-use airport located five nautical miles (9 km) south of the central business district of Sulphur, a city in Calcasieu Parish, Louisiana, United States. It is owned by the West Calcasieu Airport Managing Board and is also known as West Calcasieu Airport.

This airport is included in the FAA's National Plan of Integrated Airport Systems for 2009–2013, which categorized it as a general aviation facility. Although many U.S. airports use the same three-letter location identifier for the FAA and IATA, this facility is assigned UXL by the FAA but has no designation from the IATA.

Facilities and aircraft 
It has one runway designated 15/33 with an asphalt surface measuring 5,001 by 75 feet (1,524 x 23 m).

For the 12-month period ending July 6, 2009, the airport had 19,690 aircraft operations, an average of 53 per day: 99% general aviation and 1% military. At that time there were 29 aircraft based at this airport: 72% single-engine, 17% multi-engine and 10% ultralight.

References

External links 
 Southland Aviation, the fixed-base operator (FBO)
 

Airports in Louisiana
Buildings and structures in Calcasieu Parish, Louisiana